Trentbarton operates both local and regional bus services in Derbyshire, Leicestershire, Nottinghamshire and Staffordshire, England. It is a subsidiary of the Wellglade Group.

History

In October 1913, Trent Motor Traction Company was founded and commenced operating a bus service between Ashbourne and Derby, with a second service between Derby and Stapleford introduced the following month.

By 1925, a network of services were operating from Derby, Loughborough and Nottingham. As services expanded, the business grew, with a total of seven depots.

During the 1930s, some 52 smaller operators were bought out. In August 1949, Trent Motor Traction Company began to operate some services in partnership with Derby Corporation. In 1958 following the opening of the A52 an express service commenced between Derby and Nottingham. In 1969 the company became part of the National Bus Company and in 1972 took over fellow NBC subsidiary Midland General (and its associated Notts & Derby operation).

As part of the privatisation of the bus industry Trent was sold in a management buyout. In 1989 the business of neighbouring Barton Transport was purchased and placed into a separate legal entity even though both subsidiaries combined their operations on a day-to-day basis. The separate Trent and Barton brands were brought together as 'Trent Barton' in 2005.

Trent Barton maintains a 6% shareholding in First Leicester.

During September 2022, it was announced that current managing director Jeff Counsell will retire in February 2023 and will be succeeded by Tom Morgan who is the current commercial director for Trent Barton and Kinchbus.

Services and brands

Trentbarton operate services from Loughborough, Ashbourne, Burton upon Trent, Chesterfield, Derby, Ilkeston, Mansfield, and Nottingham with most operating under a brand name with branded vehicles although some still use conventional route numbers, Some services within the network operate through to around 03:00 on Saturday and Sunday mornings.

'Indigo' became the first route to operate a '24 hours a day, 7 days a week' from 24 July 2011 until March 2012 it also operated between East Midlands Airport and Loughborough when that section of the route was replaced by a revised 'skylink Nottingham' service which runs between Nottingham and East Midlands Airport but via a quicker route.

Buses operate from Nottingham to the suburbs of Calverton, Cotgrave and Keyworth while the 'mainline' and 'rushcliffe villager' run along the A52 to Bingham and Radcliffe-on-Trent.

In Derby, Trent Barton run some urban services, such as the non-stop 'X38' and Comet service, and 'The Mickleover' and 'The Allestree'. There are also a number of longer-distance services for example 'Swift' to Uttoxeter and 'The Sixes' to Belper and Matlock with their unusual numbering system: 6.0, 6.1, 6.2, 6.3, 6.4 and 6X. 'The Villager' services run south to Burton on Trent with the numbering system V1 and V3 plus a number of services run north towards Ilkeston and Heanor such as the Ilkeston Flyer and 'H1'.

Trent Barton also operates a number of express services around the East Midlands. These include:
'Red Arrow' service from Nottingham to Derby.
X38 (operated jointly with Arriva Derby) from Derby to Burton on Trent
Comet from Chesterfield to Derby via Clay Cross and Alfreton and Ripley

During the 1990s and 2000s Trent Barton operated a large number of 'rainbow routes', with frequent services running from Nottingham and Derby under route numbers such as 'R11, R12 and R13' from Nottingham to Eastwood and into Derbyshire, now known as 'Rainbow One' or 'Rainbow Allestree' running from Derby to the village just outside town, now known as 'The Allestree'. Most of the Rainbow routes were rebranded in the early 2000s leaving just 'Rainbow 1 to 5', running frequent buses from Nottingham to various suburban towns, when newer vehicles were launched the services were rebranded leaving just 'Rainbow One' as the remaining Rainbow brand. 

Services that operate with conventional numbers are operated using plain red vehicles which feature branding advertisements for the Mango and Hugo apps, these vehicles also substitute for a branded vehicle if it is unavailable. 

As a result of an ongoing driver shortage and lower passenger numbers following the Covid-19 pandemic, Trent Barton announced in August 2022 that already suspended services Spondon Flyer and 1A would officially be withdrawn and the 141 route transferring to Stagecoach East Midlands from 4th September then from 2nd October 2022, a number of other services were revised alongside the creation of a new local network centered around Ilkeston and Heanor to replace long standing services including AmberLine and BlackCat

High Peak Buses 

In April 2012, Trentbarton entered into a joint venture with Centrebus. This saw the company's operation in Buxton combined with Bowers Coaches', to form High Peak Buses.

The joint company operates all services previously run by Bowers Coaches, as well as the Buxton operations of Trentbarton, including the 199 service, which runs between Buxton and Manchester Airport via Stockport, as well as the Transpeak service which runs between Buxton and Derby via Matlock.

Ticketing schemes
The 'Mango' system was initially tested on the company's Rainbow 4 (now i4) and Indigo routes. After this proved successful, Trent Barton proceeded to extend the scheme to all of its services.

Depots
Trent Barton operates from depots in Derby, Langley Mill, Belper, Nottingham and Sutton in Ashfield with the Kinchbus depot in Loughborough as an outstation for some Skylink Nottingham buses.

Langley Mill depot is also the headquarters for Trentbarton and Wellglade Group.

See also
List of bus operators of the United Kingdom

References

External links

Bus operators in Derbyshire
Bus operators in Leicestershire
Bus operators in Nottinghamshire
Bus operators in Staffordshire
Transport in Nottingham
Companies based in Derbyshire
Transport in Derby